Girls2 (pronounced "Girls Girls") is a Japanese idol girl group formed by LDH in 2019. The group consist of EXPG Studio graduates who starred in Takashi Miike's Girls × Heroine series.

History

Pre-debut: Girls × Heroine series
In December 2015, Yuzuha Oda, previously a member of the idol girl group Amorecarina, participated in the TV Girls Drama Audition held by Ciao, Pucchigumi, and LDH, winning a starring role in the 2017 series Idol × Warrior Miracle Tunes! as Fuka Tachibana, a member of the girl group Miracle2. Oda performed and portrayed her character on television and music events with the rest of the Miracle2 members. When Idol × Warrior Miracle Tunes! became successful, LDH held the TV Girls Drama Audition in summer 2017 for the next installment of the series, Magical × Heroine Magimajo Pures!, which Momoka Sumitani, Misaki Tsuruya, Youka Ogawa, and Kurea Masuda had won starring roles as Rin Shirayuki, Mitsuki Hanamori, Shiori Hoshina, and Yuria Nijiiro. They released music for the series under the group name Magical2, portraying their characters on television.

2019: Debut

After the musical success of Miracle2 and Magical2, LDH debuted all previous members signed to their company as a supergroup named Girls2, along with cast members from the newly announced 2019 series Secret × Heroine Phantomirage!, Minami Hishida, Kira Yamaguchi, and Toa Harada, winners in the actress category of the 2018 LDH The Girls Audition and members of the girl group mirage2. Prior to entering acting, Sumitani, Ogawa, Masuda, and Yamaguchi were part of EXPG's U-14 female trainee group, Kizzy.

Approximately 2,000 people attended their debut showcase in Osaka. As a group, Girls2 released their debut single, "Daijyoubu", on June 26, 2019, as the opening theme song for Secret × Heroine Phantomirage! On July 6, 2019, Ran Ishii, a new cast member Secret × Heroine Phantomirage! and their tie-in group, Mirage2, was added as a member. She made her official debut with the group on October 30, 2019, with their first mini-album Koisuru Kamo.

Girls2 have collaborated with popular sports brand FILA and the kids streetwear TEG TEG.

Girls2 placed 3rd on Mercari's rank of 2019's most "trendiest word" and Ran Ishii ranked 20th on the second half of 2019 TV Appearance Ranking.

In December 2019, Girls2 announced they will be performing the theme song, "ABCDEF Girl", for the film Gekijōban: Secret × Heroine Phantomirage!: Eiga ni Natte Chōdaishimasu. Their song "Guru Guru" was also used as the theme song for 2020 film Eiga: Neko Neko Nihonshi: Ryūma no Hachamecha Time Trouble ze yo!

2020: First tour, documentary, and anime series 

On November 17, 2019, Girls2 announced their first Live Tour "Girls2 LIVE TOUR ~Chuwapane~" that would run in 8 towns starting from March 7 until June 28, 2020. They were also the opening act for E-girls PERFECT LIVE 2011 2020. To commemorate the tour, a Girls2 cafe was announced to run from March 20 to April 6. A documentary titled Girls2: The Miracle of 9 aired on TV Tokyo on March 22 and March 29.

On March 3, 2020, Oha Suta announced they will be featuring a series of animated segments starring the members and titled GARUGAKU. Saint Girls Square Academy. It began airing on April 6 every Monday with Girls2 voicing their own characters, as well as providing the opening theme, "Centimeter". On March 6, 2020, Girls2 were announced to be performing the theme song to the live-action film adaptation of Kiss Him, Not Me, titled "Watashi ga Motete Dōsunda."

For the entire month of March, a project named "Ten Made Todoke" was held where a series of 10 announcements were to be released (later adding additional news). Due to the coronavirus and music stores closing down, the release for their 2nd mini-album "Chuwapane", which was originally scheduled or April 29, was postponed to May 20.

Tsuruya and Yamaguchi were announced to become the newest regulars for the BS Fuji morning show "Gachamuku", where they replaced E-girls Yuzuna Takebe and Anna Ishii. Their broadcast began in July.

After the completion of Phantomirage, it was revealed that Girls2 would also provide the opening theme for Police × Heroine Lovepatrina! titled "Daiji na Mono" featuring the lovely2 members. Their 2nd EP is to be released on November 18. Another Online Live was also announced for November 15.

On September 24, a new project "Asadan" was announced, where Girls2 would appear on the program "Asadesu." with dance exercise instructors Keiji (Keiji Kuroki) and Bobby (Exile Nesmith). The theme song "Dancing" was released digitally on October 1 with Keiji and Bobby as features.

Two new songs were announced on October 6 and will be used as the opening and ending themes for the anime Meow Meow Japanese History. "Japanese STAR" and "Neko Neko Nihonshi Oboe Uta ~Zen Jidai Maruwakari♪~" was released digitally on October 7.

Girls2 digitally released "#Kizuna Plus" on October 14 which will be used as the first image song for Takeshita Street, Harajuku. Their song "HERE WE GO" will also be used as the "WEGO×Girls2 2020 Collaboration Song", with their collaboration outfits available from November 18. They performed both songs on "TGC Teens 2020 Winter Live" on November 13. Another documentary, Girls2 REVOLUTION, is set to be released through their YouTube channel on January 2, 2021, for 24 episodes.

2021: AnimeLIVE, Girls Revolution and Drama 
On December 23, 2020, it was revealed on Oha Suta that Girls2 are to provide the theme song "STARRRT!" for the film Gekijouban Porisu x Senshi Rabupatorina! ~Kaitou kara no Chousen! Rabu de Papatto Taihoseyo!~, which is to be released on April 29, 2021. On March 1, all 9 Girls2 members were announced to be cast, starring as their Heroine roles.

Girls2 1st LIVE PICTUREBOOK "Kyunin no Kizuna" was released on February 25, 2021.

The GaruGaku AnimeLIVE 2021 ~Tsunagu Tsunagu~ took place on March 27 and 28 where on the 2nd day, announced that a Garugaku live action drama would release summer 2021 on TV Tokyo. It was further revealed that they would provide the theme song with Oha Suta host, Subaru Kimura, would feature.

On May 31, 2021, Kurea was revealed as one of the regular casts for the 5th instalment of the Girls x Heroine series Kirameki Powers 1990's, playing the role of Princess.

Subgroups

Oha Girl from Girls2

Beginning April 2019, Oda, Sumitani, Tsuruya, Ogawa, and Masuda became regulars on the children's variety show Oha Suta as the new Oha Girls, performing under the name Oha Girl from Girls2 with each member appearing on a different day from Mondays to Fridays. Every school semester, the girls provide a new theme song for the show as well as a different sports uniform. Oha Girl from Girls2 released their debut single, "Hashire! Getsu-Ka-Sui-Moku-Kinyōbi!" on August 7, 2019. On December 18, 2019, Oha Girl from Girls2 released their second single, "Ohayō no Smile." The CD single also includes the song "Friendship No. 1" performed by Tsuruya and Masuda under the name Misaki Kurea from Girls2, which was used as the ending theme song to Puzzle & Dragons X for the month of October. Their 3rd single, for the 3rd school semester, "Girl Meets Girl", was released on February 19, 2020.

Announced through OhaSuta on March 27, 2020, the four Mirage2 members joined the OhaGirls, making all 9 Girls2 members part of the OhaSuta cast. The girls were also included in the Oha Suta All Stars Single "Ashita wo Tsukurou".

The senior Oha Girls: Yuzuha, Momoka, Misaki, Youka and Kurea, graduated from the group in March 2021.

GaruGaku Units 
With the announcement of the Girls2 anime, GARUGAKU. Saint Girls Square Academy, 3 sub-units exclusive to the anime were also announced. These included, east2 (Yuzuha and Ran), south2 (Misaki, Kurea, Kira and Youka) and west2 (Momoka and Minami). Toa later joins east2. Each unit song is used as an ending for the anime. For Ciao Fest Online, a special medley of the GaruGaku songs were performed. As well as this, the ending themes for the anime were also used as the theme songs for "Ohasuta".

On December 1, Girls2 announced they will hold another collaboration with Takeshita Street, but with GaruGaku called "Girls2×GaruGaku＝Happy2Winter2020 Takeshita Street". The song used was South2's newest song Holy Magic ~Otona ni Natte mo Tokenai Mahou~.

On January 24, 2021, via OhaSuta, the GaruGaku. Complete Best album and AnimeLIVE 2021 was announced.

Members 

  from Miracle2
  from Magical2
  from Magical2 - leader
  from Magical2
  from Magical2
  from Mirage2
  from Mirage2
  from Mirage2
  from Mirage2

Discography

Singles

Extended plays

Albums

Filmography

Television

Film

References

External links 
 
Official fanclub

Child musical groups
Japanese girl groups
Japanese pop music groups
Musical groups established in 2019
2019 establishments in Japan